HMS Meda was a schooner of the Royal Navy, built by William Westacott Ship Building Company, Barnstaple and purchased by the Royal Navy in 1880.

She commenced service on the Australia Station in 1880 as a survey vessel for hydrographic surveys. She undertook survey work along North West Australia. The Meda River and Meda Passage are named after her. She was sold in 1887 to the Colony of Western Australia.

Fate
She was sold to the Wesleyan Board of Missions in 1896. Meda was wrecked on a reef near East Cape, New Guinea on 14 June 1897.

Citations

References
Bastock, John (1988), Ships on the Australia Station, Child & Associates Publishing Pty Ltd; Frenchs Forest, Australia. 

1880 ships
Victorian-era naval ships of the United Kingdom
Survey vessels of the Royal Navy
Shipwrecks of Papua New Guinea
Ships built in England